Matthews' Southern Comfort is the debut solo album by country rock/folk rock musician Ian Matthews, and was his first album after leaving Fairport Convention in 1969. The musicians who played on it with Matthews were luminaries of the British folk rock scene and included ex-Fairport colleagues Ashley Hutchings, Simon Nicol and Richard Thompson, plus Gerry Conway, the drummer from Eclection and Fotheringay. The touring and recording band Matthews Southern Comfort who went on to release two more albums, Second Spring and Later That Same Year, would not be formed till later, with only pedal steel player Gordon Huntley and Matthews appearing on all three albums. The album was released on the Uni label (a subsidiary of MCA Records) in January 1970 simultaneously with a first single "Colorado Springs Eternal", and took its name from a song, "Southern Comfort", written by Sylvia Fricker from the Canadian folk duo Ian & Sylvia, which eventually appeared as the final track on Second Spring.

The original vinyl album was reissued on CD by Line Records in Germany in 1993 and a remastered version was issued by BGO records in 1996, not in its original form but as a 2-on-1 remaster along with Second Spring.

Track listing
"Colorado Springs Eternal"  (Steve Barlby) - 3:13
"A Commercial Proposition"  (Richard Thompson) - 3:01
"The Castle Far"  (Steve Barlby) - 2:59
"Please Be My Friend"  (Ian Matthews) - 3:23
"What We Say"  (Ian Matthews) - 3:26
"Dream Song"  (Ian Matthews) - 2:13
"Fly Pigeon Fly"  (Steve Barlby, Hamwood) - 3:22
"The Watch"  (Ian Matthews, Steve Barlby, Comford) - 2:41
"Sweet Bread"  (Steve Barlby) - 2:34
"Thoughts For A Friend"  (Ian Matthews) - 3:19
"I've Lost You"  (Steve Barlby) - 2:28
"Once Upon A Lifetime"  (Ian Matthews, Steve Barlby) - 4:27

Personnel

Ian Matthews - guitar, vocals
Gerry Conway - drums, congas, tambourine
Richard Thompson - guitars
Gordon Huntley - pedal steel guitar
Simon Nicol - guitar
Ashley Hutchings - bass
Marc Ellington - finger cymbals
Roger Coulam - piano, Hammond organ
Poli Palmer - flute
Dolly Collins - flute organ (3)
Pete Willsher - fuzz steel guitar (1)

Production
Produced by Steve Barlby and Ian Matthews
Recording Engineer: Barry Ainsworth at De Lane Lea studios.

The liner notes by John Tobler for the 1996 BGO reissue revealed 'Steve Barlby' to be 
a pseudonym for Ken Howard and Alan Blaikely, a successful song-writing partnership in the pop music industry and Matthews' managers at the time.

References

Iain Matthews albums
1970 debut albums
Decca Records albums